Kathryn Abbe (September 22, 1919 – January 18, 2014) was an American photographer.

Early life and education

Kathryn Abbe was born Kathryn McLaughlin in 1919, in Brooklyn. Her twin sister was photographer Frances McLaughlin-Gill. They were raised in Wallingford, Connecticut, and were the valedictorian and salutatorian of their graduating class at Lyman Hall High School. Abbe attended the Pratt Institute, where she studied under Walter Civardi and painter Reginald Marsh; she graduated with a Bachelor of Fine Arts degree in 1941. She also attended the New School for Social Research from 1939 until 1941, where she studied under Yasuo Kuniyoshi. In 1946, she married photographer James Abbe, Jr., the son of the Hollywood photographer James Abbe. The couple had three children. She and her sister were the cousins of artist Tomie dePaola.

Career

Abbe won Vogue magazine's Prix de Paris photography award in 1941. By 1942, she was working for Vogue under Toni Frissell; she left the magazine and became a professional freelance photographer in 1944 – one of few women to hold the position at the time. Although in the 1940s she photographed New England and Brooklyn extensively, by the mid-1940s her assignments took her around the world, notably to Paris, Havana, New York, Rome and Milan. Her subjects often included fashion icons, entertainment personalities, children, street vignettes, and artists. Her photographs of Carmen Dell'Orefice and Lisa Fonssagrives are particularly striking.

Abbe's work was published in over eighty books and international periodicals, among them, Better Homes and Gardens, McCall's, Cosmopolitan, Good Housekeeping, Paris Match, and Vogue. She was awarded more than twenty major magazine covers – a rare achievement for a female photographer of her time.

A co-author of three books, Stars of the Twenties Observed by James Abbe (1974), Twins on Twins, (with her twin sister, 1980), and Twin Lives in Photography (2011), Abbe lectured extensively and appeared on many television programs, among them, the Dick Cavett Show. A 2000 documentary, Twin Lenses, was produced by Nina Rosemblum about the lives and careers of Abbe and her sister.

References

Further reading

*

External links
Official website
"ART REVIEWS; Preserving the Island's Artifacts, and Classic Images" from The New York Times
About Kathryn Abbe
Vogue: Kathryn Abbe

1919 births
2014 deaths
20th-century American women photographers
20th-century American photographers
20th-century American women writers
21st-century American women photographers
21st-century American photographers
21st-century American women writers
American twins
People from Wallingford, Connecticut
Photographers from Connecticut 
Photographers from New York City
Pratt Institute alumni
The New School alumni
Vogue (magazine) people
Writers from Brooklyn
Writers from Connecticut